Guttahalli is a small village in the Kolar Gold Fields Taluk of Kolar district in Karnataka, India. It is situated about 4 kilometers from Kolar Gold Fields, forming the outskirts of the city.

Demographics 
According to the 2011 Indian Census, the village consists of 265 people. The town has a literacy rate of 60.38 percent which is lower than Karnataka's average of 75.36 percent.

References

Villages in Kolar district